ASCE may refer to:

 American Society of Civil Engineers
 Abuja Securities and Commodities Exchange
 AS Corbeil-Essonnes
 AS Corbeil-Essonnes (football)
 AS Corbeil-Essonnes XIII Spartans